Karlskrona Handboll was a Swedish handball club based in Karlskrona, founded in 1920. They were the first Swedish champions in 1932. They were founding members of Allsvenskan in 1934–35. They reached the Swedish championship final again in 1936, but lost to Hellas. They were relegated from Allsvenskan in 1939 and have not returned since. Until the 1950s, almost all players of the club were members of the Swedish Navy (Flottan).  In 2022 Karlskrona Handboll and HIF Karlskrona became one club, now under the name HF Karlskrona.

Crest, colours, supporters

Naming history

Kits

Sports Hall information

Name: – Karlskrona idrottshall
City: – Karlskrona
Capacity: – 1500
Address: – Björkholmskajen 3, 371 36 Karlskrona, Sweden

References

External links
  
 

Swedish handball clubs
1920 establishments in Sweden
Handball clubs established in 1920
Sport in Blekinge County
2022 mergers and acquisitions